Antequera Zapotec is the dialect of Zapotec of 16th-century colonial documents such as Córdova 1578 (Smith Stark 2007).

"Antequera" is an old name for the city of Oaxaca.

References

 Córdova, Fr. Juan de. 1886 [1578a]. Arte del idioma zapoteco. Morelia: Imprenta del Gobierno.
 Córdova, Fr. Juan de. 1987 [1578b]. Vocabulario en lengua çapoteca. México: Ediciones Toledo (INAH).
Smith Stark, Thomas. 2007. Algunos isoglosas zapotecas. Clasificación de las lenguas indígenas de México: Memorias del III Coloquio Internacional del Lingüística Mauricio Swadesh, ed. Christina Buenrostro et al., pp. 69–134. Mexico City: UNAM y Instituto Nacional de Lenguas Indígenas.

Zapotec languages